Western Grove High School is a comprehensive public high school serving students in grades seven through twelve in the remote, rural community of Western Grove, Arkansas, United States. It is the one of three high schools administered by the Ozark Mountain School District and the district's only high school in Newton County, Arkansas.

History
On July 1, 2004, the former Western Grove School District, which operated the school, consolidated into the Ozark Mountain School District.

Academics 
This Title I school is accredited by the Arkansas Department of Education (ADE). The assumed course of study follows the Smart Core curriculum developed the Arkansas Department of Education (ADE), which requires students to complete at least 22 credit units before graduation. Students engage in regular (core) and career focus courses and exams and may select Advanced Placement (AP) coursework and exams that may lead to college credit.

Extracurricular activities 
The Western Grove High School mascot and athletic emblem is the Warrior (stylized as a Native American) with school colors of royal blue and white.

Athletics 
The Western Grove Warriors participate in various interscholastic activities in the 1A Classification—the state's smallest classification—within the 1A East Conference administered by the Arkansas Activities Association. As one of the smallest schools in the state, the school athletic activities are limited to basketball (boys/girls), tennis (boys/girls), and track and field (boys/girls).

References

External links 
 

Public high schools in Arkansas
Schools in Newton County, Arkansas